Interfaith marriages are recognized between Muslims and Non-Muslim "People of the Book" (usually enumerated as Jews, Christians, and Sabians). According to the traditional interpretation of Islamic law (sharīʿa), a Muslim man is allowed to marry a Christian or Jewish woman but this ruling doesn't apply to women who belong to other Non-Muslim religious groups, whereas a Muslim woman is not allowed to marry a Non-Muslim man of any Non-Muslim religious group.

In the case of a Muslim-Christian marriage, which is to be contracted only after permission from the Christian party, the Christian spouse is not to be prevented from attending church for prayer and worship, according to the Ashtiname of Muhammad, a treaty between Muslims and Christians recorded between Muhammad and Saint Catherine's Monastery.

In some societies outside the traditional dar al-islam, interfaith marriages between Muslims and Non-Muslims are not uncommon, including marriages that contradict the historic Sunni understanding of ijmāʿ (the consensus of fuqāha) as to the bounds of legitimacy. The tradition of reformist and progressive Islam, however, permits marriage between Muslim women and Non-Muslim men; Islamic scholars opining this view include Khaleel Mohammed, Daayiee Abdullah, and Hassan Al-Turabi, among others.

Islamic tradition

In general, the Quran tells Muslim men not to marry Non-Muslim women, and it tells Muslim women not to marry Non-Muslim men, but it makes an allowance for Muslim men to marry women of the People of the Book (usually Jews, Christians, and Sabians). No such allowances are made for women. Some Muslim scholars discourage all interfaith marriages, citing cultural differences between Muslims and Non-Muslims.

Although the Quran contains no explicit prohibition for Muslim women marrying Non-Muslim men, scholars argue that the fact that Quran makes allowance for men, but not for women, means Muslim women are prohibited from interfaith marriages. Khaled Abou El Fadl writes that he did not find a single scholar in classical jurisprudence who disagreed with the prohibition of marriage between Muslim women and Non-Muslim men.

In the case of a Muslim-Christian marriage, which is to be contracted only after permission from the Christian party, the Christian spouse is not to be prevented from attending church for prayer and worship, according to the Ashtiname of Muhammad, a treaty between Muslims and Christians recorded between Muhammad and Saint Catherine's Monastery.

In the United States, for example, about one in ten Muslims are married to Non-Muslims, including about one in six Muslims under 40 and about 20% of Muslims who describe themselves as less devoutly religious. The tradition of reformist and progressive Islam, however, permits marriage between Muslim women and Non-Muslim men; Muslim scholars opining this view include Khaleel Mohammed, Daayiee Abdullah, and Hassan Al-Turabi, among others.

Modern practice
Despite Sunni Islam prohibiting Muslim women from marrying Non-Muslim men in interfaith marriages, interfaith marriages between Muslim women and Non-Muslim men take place at substantial rates, contravening the traditional Sunni understanding of ijma. The modern tradition of reformist and progressive Islam has also come to permit marriage between Muslim women and Non-Muslim men, with Islamic scholars opining this view including Khaleel Mohammed, Daayiee Abdullah, and Hassan Al-Turabi, among others. In the United States, about 10% of Muslim women are today married to Non-Muslim men.

Many Arab countries allow interfaith marriages to Christian or Jewish women but not to Christian or Jewish men. In Lebanon for example there is no civil personal status law and marriages are performed according to the religion of the spouses. Turkey allows marriages between Muslim women and Non-Muslim men through secular laws. In Tunisia since 16 September 2017, Muslim women can lawfully marry any man of any faith, or of none. In Malaysia, a Non-Muslim must convert to Islam in order to marry a Muslim and the offspring of such unions are automatically Muslims.

Recent studies on interfaith marriages in Muslim-majority countries have shown that parent attitudes remain more negative toward marriage of a daughter as compared to a son, and that "stronger religious belief was associated with more negative attitudes", though less in the case of Muslims who perceived Islam and Christianity as more similar than distinct.

See also

References

Citations

Sources

Interfaith marriage
Marriage in Islam